Hasan Hayri or Hasan Hayri Kanko, (d 1881 (1497), Akpınar, Hozat, Tunceli) - (1925), was a Kurdish politician from Dersim.

Early life
Hasanli was the son of Beyzade Murtaza Agha. After completing primary and secondary education in Dersim, he was taken to the Tribal Class of the Ottoman Military Academy on 3 October 1896. He was appointed to the 4th Army Siverek Tribal Cavalry Regiment, graduating with the rank of Lieutenant Cavalry on 24 February 1898.

Career 
While he was in charge of the Van Military Service Branch, he became a deputy of Dersim at the election held for the last period of the Meclis-i Mebusan. In 1920, he served as a deputy of Dersim in the first period of the Turkish Grand National Assembly:

He worked in the Parliament on Health and Social Aid, Petition, Economics, and National Defense Commissions.

In the Sheikh Said Rebellion, Hasan Hayri was arrested and sentenced to death at the Eastern Independence Court, arguing that he participated in actions to help the insurgents.

Personal life 
He was married and had four children. His family received the surname "Kanko" (some sources say Kano).

Death
In 1923, Şerif Pasha demanded independence for the Kurdish people at the Congress of the Treaty of Lausanne, where Turkish nationalists were engaged in negotiations. Atatürk ordered Hasan Hayri to go to parliament in Kurdish clothes, which were forbidden in Turkey, and testify that the Kurdish people did not want independence and wished to remain under Turkish governmental authority. Following the Congress of Lausanne, Hasan Hayri was arrested for wearing Kurdish clothes and for conspiracy against national security and was sentenced to death. He was hanged by Turkish forces following the court decision. Before his death he was asked his last request and said: "bury my body in the way of Kurdish people, till any Kurd passes from there spitting on my grave." He called himself "Ker Hesen" (meaning Hasan the donkey, or idiot Hasan) and at the moment of hanging, shouted, "Uh Sheikh Said, Ker Hesen has been also martyred in the way of Kurdistan!" Hasan Hayri became a symbol of betrayal among the Kurds. The Turkish government replaced his grave years after his execution.

References

Ottoman military personnel of World War I
People executed by Turkey by hanging
Sheikh Said rebellion
1881 births
1925 deaths
People from Hozat
Last Ottoman Parliamentary Assembly (1920) Tunceli Members
1st period Tunceli MPs
20th-century people from the Ottoman Empire
Ottoman Military Academy Tribal Class alumni
Ottoman Army officers